Rebollar may refer to:
Rebollar, Cáceres, a municipality in the province of Cáceres, Extremadura, Spain.
Rebollar, Soria, a municipality in the province of Soria, Castile and León, Spain.